Chel Shah may refer to:
 Chel Shah Heydar Aqa